Savage Bliss is the eleventh album from Arthur Loves Plastic and was released in 2004.

Awards 
Savage Bliss won the 2004 Wammie for Best Recording in the Electronica Category.

Release notes 
"Hell hath no fury!!! Ms. Arthur indulges her cock rock tendencies in throbbing tracks that soothe the burn of traumatic social encounters and occupational ennui. Features remixes of the 2 Skinnee J's, Stave, and Bicycle Thieves."

Track listing

Personnel 
Produced by Bev Stanton in the Flamingo Room, Silver Spring, MD.

Additional musicians 
Toda V - Loops (1) *
Omnitechnomatrix - Loops (2) *
Heather Heimbuch - Vocals (6)
Lisa Moscatiello - Guitar (6)
Ryan Fitzgerald - Loops (8) *
Lisa Moscatiello - Vocals (9)
Bev Stanton - Guitar (9)
Electroearwig - Loops (10) *
Heuristics Inc. - Loops (10) *
Chaos Is Your Destiny - Loops (12) *

* Remixed for The Tapegerm Collective

Samples 
Dialogue from the film Colossus: The Forbin Project (1)
Dialogue from an interview with film director John Waters (2)

Credits 
Album cover designed by Scot Howard, The Digital Butterfly Project

References 

Arthur Loves Plastic albums
2004 albums